A rope is a group of yarns, plies, fibres, or strands that are twisted or braided together into a larger and stronger form. Ropes have tensile strength and so can be used for dragging and lifting. Rope is thicker and stronger than similarly constructed cord, string, and twine.

Construction 

Rope may be constructed of any long, stringy, fibrous material, but generally is constructed of certain natural or synthetic fibres. Synthetic fibre ropes are significantly stronger than their natural fibre counterparts, they have a higher tensile strength, they are more resistant to rotting than ropes created from natural fibres, and they can be made to float on water. But synthetic ropes also possess certain disadvantages, including slipperiness, and some can be damaged more easily by UV light.

Common natural fibres for rope are Manila hemp, hemp, linen, cotton, coir, jute, straw, and sisal. Synthetic fibres in use for rope-making include polypropylene, nylon, polyesters (e.g. PET, LCP, Vectran), polyethylene (e.g. Dyneema and Spectra), Aramids (e.g. Twaron, Technora and Kevlar) and acrylics (e.g. Dralon). Some ropes are constructed of mixtures of several fibres or use co-polymer fibres. Wire rope is made of steel or other metal alloys.  Ropes have been constructed of other fibrous materials such as silk, wool, and hair, but such ropes are not generally available. Rayon is a regenerated fibre used to make decorative rope.

The twist of the strands in a twisted or braided rope serves not only to keep a rope together, but enables the rope to more evenly distribute tension among the individual strands. Without any twist in the rope, the shortest strand(s) would always be supporting a much higher proportion of the total load.

Size measurement
Because rope has a long history, many systems have been used to specify the size of a rope. In systems that use the inch (Imperial and US customary measurement systems), large ropes over  diameter – such as those used on ships – are measured by their circumference in inches; smaller ropes have a nominal diameter based on the circumference divided by three (as a rough approximation of pi). In the metric system of measurement, the nominal diameter is given in millimetres. The current preferred international standard for rope sizes is to give the mass per unit length, in kilograms per metre. However, even sources otherwise using metric units may still give a "rope number" for large ropes, which is the circumference in inches.

Use 

Rope has been used since prehistoric times. It is of paramount importance in fields as diverse as construction, seafaring, exploration, sports, theatre, and communications. Many types of knots have been developed to fasten with rope, join ropes, and utilize rope to generate mechanical advantage.  Pulleys can redirect the pulling force of a rope in another direction, multiply its lifting or pulling power, and distribute a load over multiple parts of the same rope to increase safety and decrease wear. 

Winches and capstans are machines designed to pull ropes.

History 

The use of ropes for hunting, pulling, fastening, attaching, carrying, lifting, and climbing dates back to prehistoric times. It is likely that the earliest "ropes" were naturally occurring lengths of plant fibre, such as vines, followed soon by the first attempts at twisting and braiding these strands together to form the first proper ropes in the modern sense of the word. The earliest evidence of suspected rope is a very small fragment of three-ply cord from a Neanderthal site dated 50,000 years ago.  This item was so small, it was only discovered and described with the help of a high power microscope.  It is slightly thicker than the average thumb-nail, and would not stretch from edge-to-edge across a little finger-nail.  There are other ways fibres can twist in nature, without deliberate construction.
 
A 40,000-year-old tool found in Hohle Fels cave in south-western Germany was identified in 2020 as very likely to be a tool for making rope. It is a  strip of mammoth ivory with four holes drilled through it. Each hole is lined with precisely cut spiral incisions.
The grooves on three of the holes spiral in a clockwise direction from each side of the strip.  The grooves on one hole spiral clockwise on one side, but counter-clockwise from the other side.  Plant fibres would have been fed through the holes and the tool twisted, creating a single ply yarn. The spiral incisions would have tended to keep the fibres in place. But the incisions cannot impart any twist to the fibres pulled through the holes.  Other 15,000-year-old objects with holes with spiral incisions, made from reindeer antler, found across Europe are thought to have been used to manipulate ropes, or perhaps some other purpose. They were originally named "batons", and thought possibly to have been carried as badges of rank.

Impressions of cordage found on fired clay provide evidence of string and rope-making technology in Europe dating back 28,000 years. Fossilized fragments of "probably two-ply laid rope of about  diameter" were found in one of the caves at Lascaux, dating to approximately 15,000 BC.

The ancient Egyptians were probably the first civilization to develop special tools to make rope. Egyptian rope dates back to 4000 to 3500 BC and was generally made of water reed fibres. Other rope in antiquity was made from the fibres of date palms, flax, grass, papyrus, leather, or animal hair. The use of such ropes pulled by thousands of workers allowed the Egyptians to move the heavy stones required to build their monuments. Starting from approximately 2800 BC, rope made of hemp fibres was in use in China. Rope and the craft of rope making spread throughout Asia, India, and Europe over the next several thousand years.

From the Middle Ages until the 18th century, in Europe ropes were constructed in ropewalks, very long buildings where strands the full length of the rope were spread out and then laid up or twisted together to form the rope. The cable length was thus set by the length of the available rope walk. This is related to the unit of length termed cable length. These long ropes were necessary in shipping as short ropes would require splicing to make them long enough to use for sheets and halyards. The strongest form of  splicing is the short splice, which doubles the cross-sectional area of the rope at the area of the splice, which would cause problems in running the line through pulleys. Any splices narrow enough to maintain smooth running would be less able to support the required weight.

Leonardo da Vinci drew sketches of a concept for a ropemaking machine, but it was never built. Remarkable feats of construction were accomplished using rope but without advanced technology: In 1586, Domenico Fontana erected the 327 ton obelisk on Rome's Saint Peter's Square with a concerted effort of 900 men, 75 horses, and countless pulleys and meters of rope. By the late 18th century several working machines had been built and patented.

Some rope is still made from natural fibres, such as coir and sisal, despite the dominance of synthetic fibres such as nylon and polypropylene, which have become increasingly popular since the 1950s.

Nylon was discovered in the late 1930s and was first introduced into fiber ropes during World War II. Indeed, the first synthetic fiber ropes were small braided parachute cords and three-strand tow ropes for gliders, made of nylon during World War II.

Styles of rope

Laid or twisted rope 

Laid rope, also called twisted rope, is historically the prevalent form of rope, at least in modern Western history. Common twisted rope generally consists of three strands and is normally right-laid, or given a final right-handed twist. The handedness of the twist is the direction of the twists as they progress away from an observer. Thus Z-twist rope is said to be right-handed, and S-twist to be left-handed.

Twisted ropes are built up in three steps. First, fibres are gathered and spun into yarns. A number of these yarns are then formed into strands by twisting. The strands are then twisted together to lay the rope. The twist of the yarn is opposite to that of the strand, and that in turn is opposite to that of the rope.  It is this counter-twist, introduced with each successive operation, which holds the final rope together as a stable, unified object.

Traditionally, a three strand laid rope is called a plain- or hawser-laid, a four strand rope is called shroud-laid, and a larger rope formed by counter-twisting three or more multi-strand ropes together is called cable-laid. Cable-laid rope is sometimes clamped to maintain a tight counter-twist rendering the resulting cable virtually waterproof. Without this feature, deep water sailing (before the advent of steel chains and other lines) was largely impossible, as any appreciable length of rope for anchoring or ship to ship transfers, would become too waterlogged – and therefore too heavy – to lift, even with the aid of a capstan or windlass.

One property of laid rope is partial untwisting when used. This can cause spinning of suspended loads, or stretching, kinking, or hockling of the rope itself.  An additional drawback of twisted construction is that every fibre is exposed to abrasion numerous times along the length of the rope. This means that the rope can degrade to numerous inch-long fibre fragments, which is not easily detected visually.

Twisted ropes have a preferred direction for coiling. Normal right-laid rope should be coiled clockwise, to prevent kinking. Coiling this way imparts a twist to the rope.  Rope of this type must be bound at its ends by some means to prevent untwisting.

Braided rope 

While rope may be made from three or more strands, modern braided rope consists of a braided (tubular) jacket over strands of fibre (these may also be braided). Some forms of braided rope with untwisted cores have a particular advantage; they do not impart an additional twisting force when they are stressed. The lack of added twisting forces is an advantage when a load is freely suspended, as when a rope is used for rappelling or to suspend an arborist. Other specialized cores reduce the shock from arresting a fall when used as a part of a personal or group safety system.

Braided ropes are generally made from nylon, polyester, polypropylene or high performance fibres such as high modulus polyethylene (HMPE) and aramid. Nylon is chosen for its strength and elastic stretch properties. However, nylon absorbs water and is 10–15% weaker when wet. Polyester is about 90% as strong as nylon but stretches less under load and is not affected by water. It has somewhat better UV resistance, and is more abrasion resistant. Polypropylene is preferred for low cost and light weight (it floats on water) but it has limited resistance to ultraviolet light, is susceptible to friction and has a poor heat resistance.

Braided ropes (and objects like garden hoses, fibre optic or coaxial cables, etc.) that have no lay (or inherent twist) uncoil better if each alternate loop is twisted in the opposite direction, such as in figure-eight coils, where the twist reverses regularly and essentially cancels out.

Single braid consists of an even number of strands, eight or twelve being typical, braided into a circular pattern with half of the strands going clockwise and the other half going anticlockwise. The strands can interlock with either twill or panama (Basked) or seldom plain weave. Kyosev introduced the German notation in English, where the floating length (German: Flechtigkeit) and the number of yarns in a group (German: Fädigkeit) in more natural way for braiding process are used, instead of the pattern names in weaving. The central void may be large or small; in the former case the term hollow braid is sometimes preferred.

Double braid, also called braid on braid, consists of an inner braid filling the central void in an outer braid, that may be of the same or different material. Often the inner braid fibre is chosen for strength while the outer braid fibre is chosen for abrasion resistance.

In a solid braid, (square braid, gasket, or form braid there are at least three or more groups of yarns, interlacing in complex (interlocking) structure. This construction is popular for gaskets and general purpose utility rope but rare in specialized high performance line.

Kernmantle rope has a core (kern) of long twisted fibres in the center, with a braided outer sheath or mantle of woven fibres. The kern provides most of the strength (about 70%), while the mantle protects the kern and determines the handling properties of the rope (how easy it is to hold, to tie knots in, and so on). In dynamic climbing line, core fibres are usually twisted to make the rope more elastic. Static kernmantle ropes are made with untwisted core fibres and tighter braid, which causes them to be stiffer in addition to limiting the stretch.

Other types 
Plaited rope is made by braiding twisted strands, and is also called square braid. It is not as round as twisted rope and coarser to the touch. It is less prone to kinking than twisted rope and, depending on the material, very flexible and therefore easy to handle and knot. This construction exposes all fibres as well, with the same drawbacks as described above. Brait rope is a combination of braided and plaited, a non-rotating alternative to laid three-strand ropes. Due to its excellent energy-absorption characteristics, it is often used by arborists. It is also a popular rope for anchoring and can be used as mooring warps. This type of construction was pioneered by Yale Cordage.

Endless winding rope is made by winding single strands of high-performance yarns around two end terminations until the desired break strength or stiffness has been reached. This type of rope (often specified as cable to make the difference between a braided or twined construction) has the advantage of having no construction stretch as is the case with above constructions. Endless winding is pioneered by SmartRigging and FibreMax.

Rock climbing 

The sport of rock climbing uses what is termed "dynamic" rope, an elastic rope which stretches under load to absorb the energy generated in arresting a fall without creating forces high enough to injure the climber. Such ropes are of kernmantle construction, as described below. 

Conversely, "static" ropes have minimal stretch and are not designed to arrest free falls. They are used in caving, rappelling, rescue applications, and industries such as window washing.  

The UIAA, in concert with the CEN, sets climbing-rope standards and oversees testing. Any rope bearing a GUIANA or CE certification tag is suitable for climbing. Climbing ropes cut easily when under load. Keeping them away from sharp rock edges is imperative.  Previous falls arrested by a rope, damage to its sheath, and contamination by dirt or solvents all weaken a rope and can render it unsuitable for further sport use. 

Rock climbing ropes are designated as suitable for single, double or twin use. A single rope is the most common, and is intended to be used by itself. Smaller diameter ropes are lighter, but wear out faster.  

Double ropes are thinner than single, usually  and under, and are intended for use in pairs. These offer a greater margin of safety against cutting, since it is unlikely that both ropes will be cut, but complicate both belaying and leading. Double ropes may be clipped into alternating pieces of protection, allowing each to stay straighter and reduce both individual and total rope drag.

Twin ropes are thin ropes which must be clipped into the same piece of protection, in effect being treated as a single strand. This adds security in situations where a rope may get cut. However new lighter-weight ropes with greater safety have virtually replaced this type of rope.

The butterfly and alpine coils are methods of coiling a rope for carrying.

Gallery of µCT/micro-CT images and animations

2D images / sections

2D flight-throughs/sections

3D renderings

3D flight-throughs/sections

Handling 

Rope made from hemp, cotton or nylon is generally stored in a cool dry place for proper storage. To prevent kinking it is usually coiled. To prevent fraying or unravelling, the ends of a rope are bound with twine (whipping), tape, or heat shrink tubing. The ends of plastic fibre ropes are often melted and fused solid; however, the rope and knotting expert Geoffrey Budworth warns against this practice thus:

Sealing rope ends this way is lazy and dangerous. A tugboat operator once sliced the palm of his hand open down to the sinews after the hardened (and obviously sharp) end of a rope that had been heat-sealed pulled through his grasp. There is no substitute for a properly made whipping.

If a load-bearing rope gets a sharp or sudden jolt or the rope shows signs of deteriorating, it is recommended that the rope be replaced immediately and should be discarded or only used for non-load-bearing tasks.

The average rope life-span is 5 years. Serious inspection should be given to line after that point. However, the use to which a rope is put affects frequency of inspection. Rope used in mission-critical applications, such as mooring lines or running rigging, should be regularly inspected on a much shorter timescale than this, and rope used in life-critical applications such as mountain climbing should be inspected on a far more frequent basis, up to and including before each use.

Avoid stepping on climbing rope, as this might force tiny pieces of rock through the sheath, which can eventually deteriorate the core of the rope.

Ropes may be flemished into coils on deck for safety,  presentation, and tidiness.

Many types of filaments in ropes are weakened by corrosive liquids, solvents, and high temperatures. Such damage is particularly treacherous because it is often invisible to the eye.

Shock loading should be avoided with general use ropes, as it can damage them. All ropes should be used within a safe working load, which is much less than their breaking strength.

A rope under tension – particularly if it has a great deal of elasticity – can be dangerous if parted. Care should be taken around lines under load.

Terminology 
"Rope" is a material, and a tool. When it is assigned  a specific function it is often referred to as a "line", especially in nautical usage. A line may get a further distinction, for example sail control lines are known as “sheets”  (e.g. A jib sheet). 

A halyard is a line used to raise and lower a sail, typically  with a shackle on its sail end. Other maritime examples of “lines” include anchor line, mooring line, fishing line, . Common items include clothesline and a chalk line. 

In some marine uses the term rope is retained, such as man rope, bolt rope, and bell rope.

See also 

 
  (splicing tool)
 
 
 
 
 
 Mooring line materials
 
 
 
  (in theatre fly system)

References

Sources 
 Gaitzsch, W. Antike Korb- und Seilerwaren, Schriften des Limesmuseums Aalen Nr. 38, 1986
 Gubser, T. Die bäuerliche Seilerei, G. Krebs AG, Basel, 1965
 Hearle, John W. S. & O'Hear & McKenna, N. H. A. Handbook of Fibre Rope Technology, CRC Press, 2004
 Lane, Frederic Chapin, 1932. The Rope Factory and Hemp Trade of Venice in the Fifteenth and Sixteenth Centuries, Journal of Economic and Business History, Vol. 4 No. 4 Suppl. (August 1932).
 Militzer-Schwenger, L.: Handwerkliche Seilherstellung, Landschaftsverband Westfalen-Lippe, 1992
 Nilson, A. Studier i svenskt repslageri, Stockholm, 1961
 Pierer, H.A. Universal-Lexikon, Altenburg, 1845
 Plymouth Cordage Company, 1931. The Story of Rope; The History and the Modern Development of Rope-Making, Plymouth Cordage Company, North Plymouth, Massachusetts
 Sanctuary, Anthony, 1996. Rope, Twine and Net Making, Shire Publications Ltd., Cromwell House, Princes Risborough, Buckinghamshire.
 Schubert, Pit. Sicherheit und Risiko in Fels und Eis, Munich, 1998
 Smith, Bruce & Padgett, Allen, 1996. On Rope. North American Vertical Rope Techniques, National Speleological Society, Huntsville, Alabama.
 Strunk, P.; Abels, J. Das große Abenteuer 2.Teil, Verlag Karl Wenzel, Marburg, 1986.
 Teeter, Emily, 1987. Techniques and Terminology of Rope-Making in Ancient Egypt, Journal of Egyptian Archaeology, Vol. 73 (1987).
 Tyson, William, no date. Rope, a History of the Hard Fibre Cordage Industry in the United Kingdom, Wheatland Journals, Ltd., London.

Further reading

External links 

 Ropewalk: A Cordage Engineer's Journey Through History History of ropemaking resource and nonprofit documentary film
 Watch How Do They Braid Rope?

 
Articles containing video clips
Climbing equipment
Mountaineering equipment
Primitive technology